Federal elections were held in Germany on 16 October 1994 to elect the members of the 13th Bundestag. The CDU/CSU alliance led by Helmut Kohl remained the largest faction in parliament, with Kohl remaining Chancellor in a narrowly re-elected coalition with the Free Democratic Party (FDP). This elected Bundestag was the largest in history until 2017, numbering 672 members.

Even though this election did not lead to a switch in government, it saw the election of many people to the Bundestag that would play an important role later. Future CDU leaders Friedrich Merz and Armin Laschet were first elected to the Bundestag in 1994, as were future cabinet ministers Norbert Röttgen and Peter Altmaier. This was the last election until 2009 that a center-right government was elected.

Issues and campaign
The Social Democratic Party (SPD) let its members elect a candidate for chancellor against Helmut Kohl after SPD leader Björn Engholm and chancellor candidate-designate had to resign in 1993 amid scandal. Rudolf Scharping, Minister-President of Rhineland-Palatinate, beat Gerhard Schröder and Heidemarie Wieczorek-Zeul in the SPD's internal election. Scharping was only elected with 40 percent of the vote and relied on campaigning with other SPD leaders and rivals such as Oskar Lafontaine and Gerhard Schröder, both self-confident and outspoken, in a "troika". Tension between them greatly hurt his campaign. In addition, Scharping was seen as a weak leader due to his lack of charisma and media skills, and therefore did not induce a lot of enthusiasm.

For the first time in their existence, Alliance 90/The Greens seemed to be willing to join a government in case a centre-left SPD–Greens coalition had a workable majority in the Bundestag.

The election also saw a "red socks" campaign used by the centre-right, including the CDU/CSU and the Free Democratic Party (FDP), to scare off a possible red–red–green coalition (SPD–Party of Democratic Socialism (PDS)–Greens). Analysts have stated that such a strategy likely paid off, as it was seen as one of the decisive elements for the narrow victory of Kohl for the CDU/CSU–FDP. The campaign was criticized as an obvious attempt to discredit the whole political left; the PDS reinterpreted it for itself by printing red socks.

Results

Results by state
Second vote (Zweitstimme, or votes for party list)

Constituency seats

List seats

Post-election 
The coalition between the CDU/CSU and the FDP was able to continue in power with Helmut Kohl as chancellor.

The PDS won four constituency seats in its power base of the former East Berlin, qualifying it for proportional representation even though the party won 4.4 percent of the vote, just short of the 5% electoral threshold required for full parliamentary status.  Under a longstanding electoral law intended to benefit regional parties, any party that wins at least three constituency seats is entitled to its share of proportionally-elected seats, regardless of vote share.

This was the first time in the history of the Federal Republic that the FDP was not the third-largest party in the chamber.

References

Sources
 The Federal Returning Officer
 Psephos

Federal elections in Germany
1994 elections in Germany
Helmut Kohl
October 1994 events in Europe